The 2014 Middle East Rally Championship season was an international rally championship sanctioned by the FIA. The championship was contested over six events held in six countries across the Middle East region, running from February to November.

Reigning champion Nasser Al-Attiyah defended his championship, winning four of the six rallies to be held, but the title was not decided until several days after the event. Al-Attiyah's fourth victory – at the Dubai International Rally – had originally been the first of the season for Khalid Al-Qassimi; Al-Qassimi had won the event by 0.3 seconds, and the championship title by a single point. Al-Attiyah protested the results, claiming that Al-Qassimi had violated designated driving regulations. Event officials rejected Al-Attiyah's protest, but the FIA's International Court of Appeal accepted a subsequent protest. Al-Qassimi was given a 30-second post-event penalty, and his one-point title-winning margin, became a deficit of thirteen to Al-Attiyah. Third place in the championship went to Abdulaziz Al-Kuwari, who won the Cyprus Rally, which was held alongside the European Rally Championship event. The season's only other winner was Nicolas Amiouni, who won his home event in Lebanon.

Event calendar and results

The 2014 MERC was as follows:

Championship standings
The 2014 MERC for Drivers points was as follows:

References

External links
Official website

Middle East Rally Championship
Middle East
Middle East Rally Championship